Eve Titus (July 16, 1922 – February 4, 2002) was an American children's writer. She is particularly known for her books featuring the anthropomorphic mice characters Anatole, a heroic and resourceful French mouse, and Basil of Baker Street, a Victorian era mouse private detective who emulates Sherlock Holmes. Anatole later became the subject of a Canadian-produced animated television series entitled Anatole while Basil was adapted into the 1986 Disney animated feature film, The Great Mouse Detective.

Titus was a member of Mystery Writers of America and The Baker Street Irregulars.

Books

Anatole
Anatole (1956)
Anatole and the Cat (1957)
Anatole and the Robot (1960)
Anatole Over Paris (1961)
Anatole in Italy (1963)
Anatole and the Poodle (1965)
Anatole and the Piano (1966)
Anatole and the Thirty Thieves (1969)
Anatole and the Toy Shop (1970)
Anatole and the Pied Piper (1979)

Basil of Baker Street
Basil of Baker Street (1958)
Basil and the Lost Colony (1964)
Basil and the Pygmy Cats (1971)
Basil in Mexico (1976)
Basil in the Wild West (1982)

Other
The Kitten Who Couldn't Purr (1960)
Mouse and the Lion (1962)
The Two Stonecutters (1967)
Mr Shaw's Shipshape Shoeshop (1970)
Why the Wind God Wept (1972)

References

External links 

 Bibliography at SciFan (Basil series)
 
 

American children's writers
Writers from New York City
20th-century American women writers
20th-century American writers
1922 births
2002 deaths